California Closets is a manufacturer of custom closets and storage for homes. The company provides its products through its showrooms franchising business systems in the United States, Canada, Mexico, Puerto Rico, and Dominican Republic. As of October 21, 1998, California Closet Company, Inc. operates as a subsidiary of FirstService Brands Inc..

History 
California Closets was founded in 1978 by Neil Balter. Balter started the business after putting shelves in a friend's closet. The company redesigns closets with new racks, shelves, drawers and baskets of various sizes and shapes.

The franchise business grew as Balter was featured on various shows including Good Morning America and The Oprah Winfrey Show.

In 1990, the company was purchased by Williams-Sonoma, Inc. In 1994, Williams-Sonoma, Inc. sold California Closets.

In 1998 FirstService Corporation acquired California Closets as a subsidiary. Today, FirstService Corporation continues to acquire franchised operations within its California Closets franchise system.

In 2017, the company began to incorporate virtual reality (VR) technology for clients to envision design projects in their homes.

External links 

 Official website

References 

Companies based in Alameda County, California
Companies based in California
Retail companies established in 1978
Franchises
American subsidiaries of foreign companies